Sowa is a surname with multiple origins, including Polish, Ghanaian, and Japanese.

Etymology

Europe 
Among individuals of European origin, the surname Sowa is derived from the Polish noun "sowa" (owl). In some cases, it may be an alternative spelling of the surname Sova, which is a Ukrainian, Czech, Belarusian, Slovak and Russian cognate. Both are derived from Proto-Slavic *sova. 

Polish name expert Kazimierz Rymut mentions the name in his book Nazwiska Polaków (The Surnames of Poles). Rymut says the name appears in records as early as 1404 and comes from the noun sowa, which means "owl". Fred Hoffman, author of Polish Surnames, explains that a common practice in the early days of surname adoption was its bestowal upon people as a nickname because of their connection to the meaning behind the name, which was, in this case, an owl.

Other countries 
The surname is also found in Ghana and Japan, with unrelated etymologies.

Notable people 
 Adam Sowa (born 1957), Polish general
 Adan Sowa (born 1954), Argentine golf player
 Alexandre Sowa (1927–2017), French racing cyclist
 Arkadiusz Sowa (born 1979), Polish marathon runner
 Armin Sowa (born 1959), German basketball player
 Charles Sowa (1933–2013), Luxembourgian race walker and coach
 François Sowa (born 1937), Luxembourgian boxer
 Hiroshi Sowa (born 1956), Japanese football player and manager
 John F. Sowa (born 1940, American computer scientist
 Marc Sowa (born 1963), Luxembourgian racewalker
 Marzena Sowa (born 1979), Polish cartoonist
 Michael Sowa (born 1945), German artist
 Richart Sowa, British artist and builder of Spiral Island
 Theo Sowa (born 1957), Ghanaian writer
 Theodosius Okan Sowa (1918–2003), Ghanaian diplomat

References

See also
 
 Sova (surname)

Polish-language surnames
Ghanaian surnames
Japanese-language surnames

de:Sowa